Many probability distributions that are important in theory or applications have been given specific names.

Discrete distributions

With finite support
 The Bernoulli distribution, which takes value 1 with probability p and value 0 with probability q = 1 − p.
 The Rademacher distribution, which takes value 1 with probability 1/2 and value −1 with probability 1/2.
 The binomial distribution, which describes the number of successes in a series of independent Yes/No experiments all with the same probability of success.
 The beta-binomial distribution, which describes the number of successes in a series of independent Yes/No experiments with heterogeneity in the success probability.
 The degenerate distribution at x0, where X is certain to take the value x0. This does not look random, but it satisfies the definition of random variable. This is useful because it puts deterministic variables and random variables in the same formalism.
 The discrete uniform distribution, where all elements of a finite set are equally likely. This is the theoretical distribution model for a balanced coin, an unbiased die, a casino roulette, or the first card of a well-shuffled deck.
 The hypergeometric distribution, which describes the number of successes in the first m of a series of n consecutive Yes/No experiments, if the total number of successes is known. This distribution arises when there is no replacement.
 The negative hypergeometric distribution, a distribution which describes the number of attempts needed to get the nth success in a series of Yes/No experiments without replacement.
 The Poisson binomial distribution, which describes the number of successes in a series of independent Yes/No experiments with different success probabilities.
Fisher's noncentral hypergeometric distribution
Wallenius' noncentral hypergeometric distribution
Benford's law, which describes the frequency of the first digit of many naturally occurring data.
 The ideal and robust soliton distributions.
 Zipf's law or the Zipf distribution. A discrete power-law distribution, the most famous example of which is the description of the frequency of words in the English language.
 The Zipf–Mandelbrot law is a discrete power law distribution which is a generalization of the Zipf distribution.

With infinite support
 The beta negative binomial distribution
 The Boltzmann distribution, a discrete distribution important in statistical physics which describes the probabilities of the various discrete energy levels of a system in thermal equilibrium. It has a continuous analogue. Special cases include:
 The Gibbs distribution
 The Maxwell–Boltzmann distribution
 The Borel distribution
 The discrete phase-type distribution, a generalization of the geometric distribution which describes the first hit time of the absorbing state of a finite terminating Markov chain.
 The extended negative binomial distribution
 The generalized log-series distribution
 The Gauss–Kuzmin distribution
 The geometric distribution, a discrete distribution which describes the number of attempts needed to get the first success in a series of independent Bernoulli trials, or alternatively only the number of losses before the first success (i.e. one less).
 The Hermite distribution
 The logarithmic (series) distribution
 The mixed Poisson distribution
 The negative binomial distribution or Pascal distribution, a generalization of the geometric distribution to the nth success.
 The discrete compound Poisson distribution
 The parabolic fractal distribution
 The Poisson distribution, which describes a very large number of individually unlikely events that happen in a certain time interval. Related to this distribution are a number of other distributions: the displaced Poisson, the hyper-Poisson, the general Poisson binomial and the Poisson type distributions. 
 The Conway–Maxwell–Poisson distribution, a two-parameter extension of the Poisson distribution with an adjustable rate of decay.
 The zero-truncated Poisson distribution, for processes in which zero counts are not observed
 The Polya–Eggenberger distribution
 The Skellam distribution, the distribution of the difference between two independent Poisson-distributed random variables.
 The skew elliptical distribution
 The Yule–Simon distribution
 The zeta distribution has uses in applied statistics and statistical mechanics, and perhaps may be of interest to number theorists. It is the Zipf distribution for an infinite number of elements.

Absolutely continuous distributions

Supported on a bounded interval
 The Beta distribution on [0,1], a family of two-parameter distributions with one mode, of which the uniform distribution is a special case, and which is useful in estimating success probabilities.
 The four-parameter Beta distribution, a straight-forward generalization of the Beta distribution to arbitrary bounded intervals .
 The arcsine distribution on [a,b], which is a special case of the Beta distribution if α = β = 1/2, a = 0, and b = 1.
 The PERT distribution is a special case of the four-parameter beta distribution.
 The uniform distribution or rectangular distribution on [a,b], where all points in a finite interval are equally likely, is a special case of the four-parameter Beta distribution.
 The Irwin–Hall distribution is the distribution of the sum of n independent random variables, each of which having the uniform distribution on [0,1].
 The Bates distribution is the distribution of the mean of n independent random variables, each of which having the uniform distribution on [0,1].
 The logit-normal distribution on (0,1).
 The Dirac delta function although not strictly a probability distribution, is a limiting form of many continuous probability functions.  It represents a discrete probability distribution concentrated at 0 — a degenerate distribution — it is a Distribution (mathematics) in the generalized function sense; but the notation treats it as if it were a continuous distribution.
 The Kent distribution on the two-dimensional sphere.
 The Kumaraswamy distribution is as versatile as the Beta distribution but has simple closed forms for both the cdf and the pdf.
 The logit metalog distribution, which is highly shape-flexible, has simple closed forms, and can be parameterized with data using linear least squares.
 The Marchenko–Pastur distribution is important in the theory of random matrices.
 The bounded quantile-parameterized distributions, which are highly shape-flexible and can be parameterized with data using linear least squares (see Quantile-parameterized distribution#Transformations)
 The raised cosine distribution on []
 The reciprocal distribution 
 The triangular distribution on [a, b], a special case of which is the distribution of the sum of two independent uniformly distributed random variables (the convolution of two uniform distributions).
 The trapezoidal distribution
 The truncated normal distribution on [a, b].
 The U-quadratic distribution on [a, b].
 The von Mises–Fisher distribution on the N-dimensional sphere has the von Mises distribution as a special case. 
 The Bingham distribution on the N-dimensional sphere.
 The Wigner semicircle distribution is important in the theory of random matrices.
 The continuous Bernoulli distribution is a one-parameter exponential family that provides a probabilistic counterpart to the binary cross entropy loss.

Supported on intervals of length 2 – directional distributions 

 The Henyey–Greenstein phase function
 The Mie phase function
 The von Mises distribution
 The wrapped normal distribution 
 The wrapped exponential distribution 
 The wrapped Lévy distribution 
 The wrapped Cauchy distribution 
 The wrapped Laplace distribution 
 The wrapped asymmetric Laplace distribution
 The Dirac comb of period 2, although not strictly a function, is a limiting form of many directional distributions. It is essentially a wrapped Dirac delta function. It represents a discrete probability distribution concentrated at 2n — a degenerate distribution — but the notation treats it as if it were a continuous distribution.

Supported on semi-infinite intervals, usually [0,∞)
 The Beta prime distribution
 The Birnbaum–Saunders distribution,  also known as the fatigue life distribution, is a probability distribution used extensively in reliability applications to model failure times.
 The chi distribution
 The noncentral chi distribution
 The chi-squared distribution, which is the sum of the squares of n independent Gaussian random variables. It is a special case of the Gamma distribution, and it is used in goodness-of-fit tests in statistics.
 The inverse-chi-squared distribution
 The noncentral chi-squared distribution
 The scaled inverse chi-squared distribution
 The Dagum distribution
 The exponential distribution, which describes the time between consecutive rare random events in a process with no memory.
 The exponential-logarithmic distribution
 The F-distribution, which is the distribution of the ratio of two (normalized) chi-squared-distributed random variables, used in the analysis of variance. It is referred to as the beta prime distribution when it is the ratio of two chi-squared variates which are not normalized by dividing them by their numbers of degrees of freedom.
 The noncentral F-distribution
 The folded normal distribution 
 The Fréchet distribution
 The Gamma distribution, which describes the time until n consecutive rare random events occur in a process with no memory.
 The Erlang distribution, which is a special case of the gamma distribution with integral shape parameter, developed to predict waiting times in queuing systems
 The inverse-gamma distribution
 The generalized gamma distribution
 The generalized Pareto distribution
 The Gamma/Gompertz distribution
 The Gompertz distribution
 The half-normal distribution
 Hotelling's T-squared distribution
 The inverse Gaussian distribution, also known as the Wald distribution
 The Lévy distribution
 The log-Cauchy distribution
 The log-Laplace distribution
 The log-logistic distribution
 The log-metalog distribution, which is highly shape-flexile, has simple closed forms, can be parameterized with data using linear least squares, and subsumes the log-logistic distribution as a special case.
 The log-normal distribution, describing variables which can be modelled as the product of many small independent positive variables.
 The Lomax distribution
 The Mittag-Leffler distribution
 The Nakagami distribution
 The Pareto distribution, or "power law" distribution, used in the analysis of financial data and critical behavior.
 The Pearson Type III distribution
 The Phase-type distribution, used in queueing theory
 The phased bi-exponential distribution is commonly used in pharmacokinetics
 The phased bi-Weibull distribution
 The semi-bounded quantile-parameterized distributions, which are highly shape-flexible and can be parameterized with data using linear least squares (see 
 The Rayleigh distribution
 The Rayleigh mixture distribution
 The Rice distribution
 The shifted Gompertz distribution
 The type-2 Gumbel distribution
 The Weibull distribution or Rosin Rammler distribution, of which the exponential distribution is a special case, is used to model the lifetime of technical devices and is used to describe the particle size distribution of particles generated by grinding, milling and crushing operations.
 The Modified half-normal distribution.
 The  Polya-Gamma distribution
The  Modified Polya-Gamma distribution.

Supported on the whole real line

 The Behrens–Fisher distribution, which arises in the Behrens–Fisher problem.
 The Cauchy distribution, an example of a distribution which does not have an expected value or a variance. In physics it is usually called a Lorentzian profile, and is associated with many processes, including resonance energy distribution, impact and natural spectral line broadening and quadratic stark line broadening.
 The centralized inverse-Fano distribution, which is the distribution representing the ratio of independent normal and gamma-difference random variables.
 Chernoff's distribution
 The exponentially modified Gaussian distribution, a convolution of a normal distribution with an exponential distribution, and the Gaussian minus exponential distribution, a convolution of a normal distribution with the negative of an exponential distribution.
 The expectile distribution, which nests the Gaussian distribution in the symmetric case.
 The Fisher–Tippett, extreme value, or log-Weibull distribution
 Fisher's z-distribution
 The skewed generalized t distribution
 The gamma-difference distribution, which is the distribution of the difference of independent gamma random variables.
 The generalized logistic distribution
 The generalized normal distribution
 The geometric stable distribution
 The Gumbel distribution
 The Holtsmark distribution, an example of a distribution that has a finite expected value but infinite variance.
 The hyperbolic distribution
 The hyperbolic secant distribution
 The Johnson SU distribution
 The Landau distribution
 The Laplace distribution
 The Lévy skew alpha-stable distribution or stable distribution is a family of distributions often used to characterize financial data and critical behavior; the Cauchy distribution, Holtsmark distribution, Landau distribution, Lévy distribution and normal distribution are special cases.
 The Linnik distribution
 The logistic distribution
 The map-Airy distribution
 The metalog distribution, which is highly shape-flexible, has simple closed forms, and can be parameterized with data using linear least squares.
 The normal distribution, also called the Gaussian or the bell curve. It is ubiquitous in nature and statistics due to the central limit theorem: every variable that can be modelled as a sum of many small independent, identically distributed variables with finite mean and variance is approximately normal.
 The normal-exponential-gamma distribution
 The normal-inverse Gaussian distribution
 The Pearson Type IV distribution (see Pearson distributions)
 The Quantile-parameterized distributions, which are highly shape-flexible and can be parameterized with data using linear least squares.
 The skew normal distribution
 Student's t-distribution, useful for estimating unknown means of Gaussian populations.
 The noncentral t-distribution
 The skew t distribution
 The Champernowne distribution
 The type-1 Gumbel distribution
 The Tracy–Widom distribution
 The Voigt distribution, or Voigt profile, is the convolution of a normal distribution and a Cauchy distribution. It is found in spectroscopy when spectral line profiles are broadened by a mixture of Lorentzian and Doppler broadening mechanisms.
 The Chen distribution.

With variable support
 The generalized extreme value distribution has a finite upper bound or a finite lower bound depending on what range the value of one of the parameters of the distribution is in (or is supported on the whole real line for one special value of the parameter
 The generalized Pareto distribution has a support which is either bounded below only, or bounded both above and below
 The metalog distribution, which provides flexibility for unbounded, bounded, and semi-bounded support, is highly shape-flexible, has simple closed forms, and can be fit to data using linear least squares.
 The Tukey lambda distribution is either supported on the whole real line, or on a bounded interval, depending on what range the value of one of the parameters of the distribution is in.
The Wakeby distribution

Mixed discrete/continuous distributions
 The rectified Gaussian distribution replaces negative values from a normal distribution with a discrete component at zero.
 The compound poisson-gamma or Tweedie distribution is continuous over the strictly positive real numbers, with a mass at zero.

Joint distributions

For any set of independent random variables the probability density function of their joint distribution is the product of their individual density functions.

Two or more random variables on the same sample space

 The Dirichlet distribution, a generalization of the beta distribution.
 The Ewens's sampling formula is a probability distribution on the set of all partitions of an integer n, arising in population genetics.
 The Balding–Nichols model
 The multinomial distribution, a generalization of the binomial distribution.
 The multivariate normal distribution, a generalization of the normal distribution.
 The multivariate t-distribution, a generalization of the Student's t-distribution.
 The negative multinomial distribution, a generalization of the negative binomial distribution.
 The Dirichlet negative multinomial distribution, a generalization of the beta negative binomial distribution.
 The generalized multivariate log-gamma distribution
 The Marshall–Olkin exponential distribution
 The continuous-categorical distribution, an exponential family supported on the simplex that generalizes the continuous Bernoulli distribution.

Distributions of matrix-valued random variables

 The Wishart distribution
 The inverse-Wishart distribution
 The Lewandowski-Kurowicka-Joe distribution
 The matrix normal distribution
 The matrix t-distribution
 The Matrix Langevin distribution
 The matrix variate beta distribution

Non-numeric distributions
 The categorical distribution

Miscellaneous distributions

 The Cantor distribution
 The generalized logistic distribution family
 The metalog distribution family
 The Pearson distribution family
 The phase-type distribution

See also 

 Mixture distribution
 Cumulative distribution function
 Likelihood function
 List of statistical topics
 Probability density function
 Random variable
 Histogram
 Truncated distribution
 Copula (statistics)
 Probability distribution
 Relationships among probability distributions
 ProbOnto a knowledge base and ontology of probability distributions, URL: probonto.org

References

Probability distributions